The 18th New York Infantry Regiment ( "New York State Rifles") was an infantry regiment in the Union Army during the American Civil War.

Service
The 18th New York Infantry was organized May 13, 1861 at Albany, New York and mustered in on May 17, 1861 for two years' service under the command of Colonel William A. Jackson.

The regiment was attached to Davies' Brigade, Miles' Division, McDowell's Army of Northeast Virginia, June to August 1861. Franklin's Brigade, Division of the Potomac, to October 1861. Newton's Brigade, Franklin's Division, Army of the Potomac, to March 1862. 3rd Brigade, 1st Division, I Corps, Army of the Potomac, to May 1862. 3rd Brigade, 1st Division, VI Corps, to May 1863.

The 18th New York Infantry mustered out of the service on May 28, 1863. Men who enlisted for three years' service were transferred to the 121st New York Volunteer Infantry on May 11, 1863.

Detailed service
Left New York for Washington, D.C., June 19. Reconnaissance on Fairfax Road, July 14, 1861. Advance on Manassas, Virginia, July 16–21. Fairfax Court House, July 17. First Battle of Bull Run, July 21. Duty in the defenses of Washington, D.C., until March 1862. Skirmish at Springfield Station, October 3, 1861. Advance on Manassas, Virginia, March 10–15, 1862. McDowell's advance on Fredericksburg, Virginia, April 4–12. Ordered to the Virginia Peninsula, April 22. Siege of Yorktown, April 24 – May 4 (on transports). West Point, May 7–8. Seven Days Battles before Richmond, June 25 – July 1. Gaines's Mill, June 27. White Oak Swamp and Glendale, June 30. Malvern Hill, July 1. At Harrison's Landing until August 16. Movement to Fort Monroe, then to Centreville, August 16–28. In works at Centreville, August 29–31. Cover Pope's retreat to Fairfax Court House, September 1. Maryland Campaign, September 6–22. Crampton's Pass, South Mountain, September 14. Battle of Antietam, September 16–17. Duty in Maryland until October 30. Movement to Falmouth, Virginia, October 30 – November 19. Battle of Fredericksburg, December 12–15. "Mud March", January 20–24, 1863. At Falmouth until April. Chancellorsville Campaign, April 27 – May 6. Operations at Franklin's Crossing, April 29 – May 2. Maryes Heights, Fredericksburg, May 3. Salem Heights, May 3–4. Banks' Ford, May 4. Regiment moved to New York May 16.

Casualties
The regiment lost a total of 71 men during service; four officers and 34 enlisted men killed or mortally wounded, one officer and 32 enlisted men died of disease.

Commanders
 Colonel William A. Jackson – died November 11, 1861 in Washington, D.C. due to typhoid fever.
 Colonel William H. Young – resigned August 14, 1862, due to illness.
 Colonel George Ranney Myers

See also

 List of New York Civil War regiments
 New York in the Civil War
 www.18thnyi.com

References
 Conklin, Ryan A. "The 18th New York in the Civil War: A History and Roster" (Jefferson, NC: McFarland Pub. Co.), 2016
 Dyer, Frederick H. A Compendium of the War of the Rebellion (Des Moines, IA: Dyer Pub. Co.), 1908.
 Memoir of William A. Jackson: A Member of the Albany bar, and Colonel of the 18th Regiment, N.Y. Volunteers, Who Died at the City of Washington, November 11, 1861 (Albany, NY: J. Munsell), 1862.
Attribution

External links
18th New York Infantry: History of a Civil War Regiment

Military units and formations established in 1861
1861 establishments in New York (state)
Military units and formations disestablished in 1863
Infantry 018